St Patrick's Chapel is a ruined building that stands on a headland above St Peter's Church, in Heysham, Lancashire, England.  It is recorded in the National Heritage List for England as a designated Grade I listed building, and is a Scheduled Ancient Monument.

Description

The ruin dates from the 8th or 9th century, and is built of sandstone rubble. Consolidation work was carried out in 1903 using stone tiles. Most of the south wall, the east gable wall, and the east part of the north wall are still present. The south wall contains a doorway with long-and-short jambs and an arch with concentric grooves. Near the chapel is a group of six rock-cut tombs and a separate group of two rock-cut tombs. Each group is listed at Grade I, and each tomb has an associated socket probably intended for a timber cross.

Archaeology

In 1977 an excavation took place in and to the south of the chapel, which dated the site to the late 6th or early 7th century.  The buried skeletons uncovered were dated as no earlier than the 10th century.  A further excavation took place in April 1993 on land below the stone coffins.  No human bones were found but more than 1,200 artefacts were recovered, which showed that the site had been occupied about 12,000 years ago.

See also

Grade I listed churches in Lancashire
Grade I listed buildings in Lancashire
Scheduled monuments in Lancashire
Listed buildings in Heysham

References

External links

 Oxford University Woruldhord project - St Patrick's Chapel

Ruins in Lancashire
Chapels in England
Scheduled monuments in Lancashire
Roman Catholic churches in Lancashire
Churches in the City of Lancaster
Grade I listed churches in Lancashire